Seesaw is a cover album of soul and blues  classics recorded by American singer Beth Hart and blues rock guitarist Joe Bonamassa in 2013. It follows up on the success of their initial collaboration for the Don't Explain cover album in 2011. Seesaw was nominated for a Grammy Award for Best Blues Album of 2013.

Track listing

Personnel

Musicians
Joe Bonamassa – guitar, vocals
Blondie Chaplin – rhythm guitar, percussion, backing vocals
Ron Dziubla – saxophone
Anton Fig – drums, percussion
Beth Hart – vocals, liner notes
Carmine Rojas – bass
Arlan Schierbaum – piano, organ
Lee Thornburg – trumpet, trombone

Production
Jeff Bova – string arrangement 
Jeff Katz – photography
Jared Kvitka – engineer
Bob Ludwig – mastering
Kevin Shirley – engineer, mixing, producer
Marcus Bird – photography and direction
Lee Thornburg – brass arrangement 
Roy Weisman – executive producer

Chart positions

References

2013 albums
Beth Hart albums
Joe Bonamassa albums
Covers albums
Collaborative albums